Eulimnogammaridae is a family of amphipods belonging to the order Amphipoda.

Genera
Genera:
 Abyssogammarus Sowinsky, 1915
 Barguzinia Kamaltynov, 2002
 Bazikalovia Tachteew, 2001
 Berchinia Kamaltynov, 2002
 Eulimnogammarus Bazikalova, 1945
 Fluviogammarus Dorogostaisky, 1917
 Heterogammarus Stebbing, 1899
 Laxmannia Kamaltynov, 2002
 Leptostenus Bazikalova, 1945
 Lobogammarus Bazikalova, 1945
 Macropereiopus Sowinsky, 1915
 Odontogammarus Stebbing, 1899
 Polyacanthisca Bazikalova, 1937
 Profundalia Kamaltynov, 2002
 Sluginella Kamaltynov, 2002
 Tengisia Kamaltynov, 2002

References

Amphipoda